Anasimyia perfidiosus is a species of syrphid fly in the family Syrphidae, found in North America.

This species was formerly a member of the genus Lejops, and is sometimes called Lejops perfidiosus.

References

Eristalinae
Articles created by Qbugbot
Insects described in 1897
Hoverflies of North America